Crown Casino may refer to:

Crown Melbourne
Crown Perth
Crown Sydney, a casino under construction
Crown Sri Lanka, a proposed and cancelled project in Sri Lanka